Borotutu is traditional medicine made from the African tree Cochlospermum angolense. As the name indicates, it is widespread in parts of Angola, where it is known as mburututu in the Chokwe and Kimbundu languages.

Uses
Borututu bark is claimed to have hepatic healing properties and a general cleansing effect. Borotutu bark pills and herbal teas are sold in health stores. The bark showed activity against the rodent malaria parasite Plasmodium berghei in laboratory tests.

In Ghana, Borututu bark is locally known as paajawu and added to Shea Butter during the boiling process for a vibrant yellow coloring.

References

External links 
 

Plants used in traditional African medicine
Food colorings